Keykavus was the 30th ruler of Shirvan.

Reign
Not much information is known about Keykavus. An inscription on Pir Husayn Khangah bears his name which dates to 693 Rajab, Hijri. He was father-in-law of Rashid-al-Din Hamadani's son Amir Ali. He was a vassal of the Ilkhanate. No other information about him survives.

References

1317 deaths
Year of birth unknown
14th-century Iranian people
13th-century Iranian people